Michael V. Lane (January 6, 1933 – June 1, 2015) was an American actor and professional wrestler.

Biography
Lane's size (height 6'8" or 2.03 m, weight 275 lbs or 125 kg) led him to work in the King Bros. Circus boxing tent and wrestling tent. He also wrestled professionally under the name "Tarzan Mike" in 1952–1959. While filming The Harder They Fall, Lane was given dramatic and boxing lessons to appear as the giant Toro Moreno, an outclassed boxer based on Primo Carnera.

Lane made numerous television appearances including a role as a country bumpkin who gets talked into boxing by Bret Maverick (James Garner) and Dandy Jim Buckley (Efrem Zimbalist Jr.) in an epic 1957 episode of Maverick entitled "Stampede." Lane also had a regular role as Frank N. Stein in Monster Squad (1976).

Filmography

Film

Television

References

External links

 

1933 births
2015 deaths
American male film actors
American male professional wrestlers
Professional wrestlers from Washington, D.C.
People from Los Angeles
Professional wrestlers from California